Aperiodic crystals lack three-dimensional translational symmetry but still exhibit three-dimensional long-range order. In other words, they are periodic crystals in higher dimensions. They are classified into three different categories: incommensurate modulated structures, incommensurate composite structures, and quasicrystals. 

The diffraction patterns of aperiodic crystals contain two sets of peaks, which include "main reflections" and "satellite reflections". Main reflections are usually stronger in intensity and span a lattice defined by three-dimensional reciprocal lattice vectors. Satellite reflections are weaker in intensity and are known as "lattice ghosts". These reflections do not correspond to any lattice points in physical space and cannot be indexed with the original three vectors. To understand aperiodic crystal structures, one must use the superspace approach. In materials science, "superspace" or higher-dimensional space refers to the concept of describing the structures and properties of materials in terms of dimensions beyond the three dimensions of physical space. This may involve using mathematical models to describe the behavior of atoms or molecules in a materials in four, five, or even higher dimensions.

History 
The history of aperiodic crystals can be traced back to the early 20th century, when the science of crystallography was in its infancy. At that time, it was generally accepted that the ground state of matter was always an ideal crystal with three-dimensional space group symmetry, or lattice periodicity. However, in the late 1900s, a number of developments in the field of crystallography challenged this belief. Researchers began to focus on the scattering of X-rays and other particles beyond just the Bragg peaks, which allowed them to better understand the effects of defects and finite size on the structure of crystals, as well as the presence of additional spots in diffraction patterns due to periodic variations in the crystal structure. These findings showed that the ground state of matter was not always an ideal crystal, and that other, more complex structures could also exist. These structures were later classified as aperiodic crystals, and their study has continued to be an active area of research in the field of crystallography.

Mathematics of the superspace approach 
The fundamental property of aperiodic crystal can be understood as a three dimensional physical space where the atoms are positioned plus additional dimensions of the second subspace.

Superspace 

Dimensionalities of aperiodic crystals:
 , 
 , 
 .

The "" represents the dimensions of the first subspace, which is also called the "external space" or "parallel space".

The "" represents the additional dimension of the second subspace, which is also called "internal space" ('') or "perpendicular space". It is perpendicular to the first subspace. 

 

In summary, superspace is the direct sum of two subspaces. With the superspace approach, we can now describe a three-dimensional aperiodic structure as a higher dimensional periodic structure.

Peak indexing 

To index all Bragg peaks, both main and satellite reflections, additional lattice vectors must be introduced:

 , 
 ,
 .

With respect to the three reciprocal lattice vectors  spanned by the main reflection, the fourth vector  can be expressed by 
 .

 is modulation wave vector, which represents the direction and wavelength of the modulation wave through the crystal structure. 

If at least one of the  values is an irrational number, then the structure is considered to be "incommensurately modulated".

With the superspace approach, we can project the diffraction pattern from a higher-dimensional space to three-dimensional space.

Example

Biphenyl

The biphenyl molecule is a simple organic molecular compound consisting of two phenyl rings bonded by a central C-C single bond, which exhibits a modulated molecular crystal structure. Two competing factors are important for the molecule's conformation. One is steric hindrance of ortho-hydrogen, which leads to the repulsion between electrons and causes torsion of the molecule. As a result, the conformation of the molecule is non-planar, which often occurs when biphenyl is in the gas phase. The other factor is the -electron effect which favors coplanarity of the two planes. This is often the case when biphenyl is at room temperature.

References 

Crystal structure types